Coulouvray-Boisbenâtre is a commune in the Manche department in Normandy in north-western France.

Geography

Climate
Coulouvray-Boisbenâtre has an oceanic climate (Köppen climate classification Cfb).

See also
Communes of the Manche department

References

Coulouvrayboisbenatre